State Research and Design Shipbuilding Center is a design bureau specializing in shipbuilding and located in Mykolaiv, Ukraine. It is part of the Ukrainian Defense Industries state corporation.

History
Established in 1975 as a regional division of the Northern Planning and Design Bureau (Severnoe PDB, Leningrad) known as the 61st department. 

During dissolution of the Soviet Union in 1990 it was transformed into the Southern Planning and Design Burea (Yuzhnoe PDB, Mykolaiv).

After the succession of Ukraine from the Soviet Union in 1992, the company became a major state design bureau, the State Research and Design Shipbuilding Center located in a seaport of Ukraine, Mykolaiv next to several shipyards.

Other design bureaus
 Central Design Bureau "Chornomorets" (1949–2018), Sevastopol

Projects

Warships
 Tornado-class frigate (Wele Nzas frigate for Equatorial Guinea)
 Amazonia-class corvette
 Neptun-class corvette
 Muson-class corvette
 Volodymyr Velykyi-class corvette
 Hajduk-class corvette (Ukrainian continuation of the Soviet Grisha-class corvette)
 Hajduk-M class corvette
 Project RS655 class corvette
 Karakal-class small corvette
 Triton-class landing ship
 BPS-500-class missile boat

Smaller crafts
 Gurza-class boat
 Gyurza-M class artillery boats
 Centaur-class fast assault craft
 Lan-class missile boats (sold to Vietnam; see TT-400TP gunboat)
 Project Pearl-fac class fast attack craft
 Dozor-class offshore patrol vessel
 Bryz-40M class patrol boats
 Bryz-40P class coast guard boats
 Koral-class patrol boat (Ukrainian continuation of the Soviet Stenka-class patrol boat)
 Arho-2000 class search and rescue
 Bobr-class landing craft

References

External links
 Official website
 List of companies in Ukraine specialized in shipbuilding. Ukrainian Defense Industries.
 Brazilian military targets the Ukrainian corvettes. UNIAN. August 1, 2013.
 The first corvette of Ukrainian production will join the Navy before 2017. Ukraine Industrial (portal). September 1, 2013.

Defence companies of the Soviet Union
Design companies established in 1975
Defence companies of Ukraine
Economy of Mykolaiv
1975 establishments in the Soviet Union
Ukroboronprom
Design bureaus